is a railway station in the city of Itoigawa, Niigata, Japan, operated by Echigo Tokimeki Railway.

Lines

Station layout
The station consists of two opposed side platforms on an embankment, with the station building at ground level. The station is unattended.

Platforms

Adjacent stations

History
The station opened on 28 January 1950, as part of the Japan National Railways (JNR). From this date, Uramoto Station was transferred to the ownership of the third-sector operating company Echigo Tokimeki Railway.

Passenger statistics
In fiscal 2017, the station was used by an average of 11 passengers daily (boarding passengers only).

See also
 List of railway stations in Japan

References

External links

Train timetables 

Railway stations in Niigata Prefecture
Railway stations in Japan opened in 1950
Stations of Echigo Tokimeki Railway
Itoigawa, Niigata